Nantlle Vale F.C are a Welsh football club from Penygroes, near Caernarfon, formed around 1920. They play in the Ardal Leagues North West, which is at tier 3 of the Welsh football pyramid

History
They were notorious in the early 1970s for their very robust style of play, when the team featured noted hard men such as player-manager Orig Williams – a professional wrestler by trade, who fought under the stage name El Bandito – and defender Idris Evans, better known by his nickname of Tarw Nefyn (the Nefyn Bull). Williams was once famously sent off in only the third minute of a match at Bangor City. His autobiography Cario'r Ddraig was published in the 1990s.

Honours

League
 Caernarfon & District League:
 Champions (1): 2000–01
 Gwynedd League:
 Champions (1): 1987–88
 Gwyrfai League:
 Champions (1): 1924
 Welsh League Division One (North)
 Champions (1): 1959–60
 Welsh League Second Division (East)
 Champions (2)

Cups
 Amateur Cup:
 Winners (2): 1973–74, 1974–75
 Barritt Cup:
 Winners (1): 2001–02
 Challenge Cup:
 Winners (1)
 Cooks Cup:
 Winners (1): 1938–39
 Cookson Cup:
 Winners (1): 1959–60
 Intermediate Cup:
 Winners (1): 1975–76
 Lleyn & District Cup: 
 Winners (1): 1938–39
 Moorings Cup:
 Winners (3): 1989–90, 1999–2000, 2000–01
 Penrhyn Cup:
 Winners (1): 1973–74
 President Cup:
 Winners (1): 2002–03
 Snowdonia Shield:
 Winners (1): 1987–88
 North Wales Coast FA Junior Challenge Cup:
 Winners (1): 2000-01

Source: Nantlle Vale Football Club – The Official Nantlle Valley Website, Welsh Alliance League

References

External links
Official Website
Nantlle Vale Football Club – The Official Nantlle Valley Website

Football clubs in Wales
Welsh Alliance League clubs
Ardal Leagues clubs
Caernarfon & District League clubs
Gwynedd League clubs
Welsh League North clubs
Bangor & District League clubs
North Wales Coast League clubs